Osro is a ghost town in Chautauqua County, Kansas, United States.

History
A post office in Chautauqua County called Ozro operated from 1888 to 1892.

References

Further reading

External links
 Chautauqua County maps: Current, Historic, KDOT

Ghost towns in Kansas